Collegiate High School is a charter high school located on the Lakeland, Florida campus of Polk State College.

The program is unique in that it is located in a college campus and offers high school juniors and seniors the opportunity to earn their associate degree or MCSE/CNE certification (for IT students) at the same time as their high school diploma, with course registration and textbooks provided completely free of charge.

Admittance
Admittance to CHS is based on a lottery of sorts. Potential candidates for the program are screened toward the end of their sophomore year to verify that they have an unweighted 3.2 GPA for the AA or a 2.5 GPA for either the IT or Allied Health programs. They must also have a minimum of eleven high school credits and be on track for graduation. Then, they are mailed an invitation to an information session and are given registration packets. There is then a random drawing from the registered students to choose the ones who will attend the following school year.

References

Educational institutions established in 2004
High schools in Polk County, Florida
Public high schools in Florida
Charter schools in Florida
Schools in Lakeland, Florida
2004 establishments in Florida